Words from the Front is Tom Verlaine's third solo album, released in 1982. It was issued on compact disc in 2008 by Collectors' Choice Music. Music videos were made for "Words from the Front" and "Clear It Away" directed by Ed Steinberg.

Track listing
All songs written by Tom Verlaine

Side one
 "Present Arrived" – 5:17
 "Postcard from Waterloo" – 3:32
 "True Story" – 5:25
 "Clear It Away" – 4:11

Side two
 "Words from the Front" – 6:42
 "Coming Apart" – 2:59
 "Days on the Mountain" – 8:55

Personnel 
 Tom Verlaine – guitars, vocals
 Thommy Price – drums
 Jimmy Ripp – guitars
 Joe Vasta - bass

 Additional personnel

 Fred Smith – bass on "Clear It Away"
 Jay Dee Daugherty – drums on "Clear It Away"
 Allan Schwartzberg – drums on "Days on the Mountain"
 Lene Lovich – saxophone on "Days on the Mountain", vocals on "Postcard from Waterloo"
Technical
 Dave Jerden - mixing
 Michael Ewasko - engineer
Rich Mahon - illustration
Howard Rosenberg - photography

Reception
Words from the Front was ranked among the top fifty "Albums of the Year" for 1982 by NME.

References 

Tom Verlaine albums
1982 albums
Virgin Records albums